Anti-Ukrainian sentiment, Ukrainophobia or anti-Ukrainianism is animosity towards Ukrainians, Ukrainian culture, the Ukrainian language, Ukraine as a nation, or all of the above.

Modern scholars divide anti-Ukrainian sentiment into two types. One type consists of discrimination against Ukrainians based on their ethnic or cultural origin, typical forms of xenophobia, racism, and broader anti-Slavic sentiment. Another type consists of the conceptual rejection of Ukrainians as an actual ethnic group and the rejection of the Ukrainian culture and language, based on the belief that they are "unnatural" because they were "artificially formed"; at the turn of the 20th century, several Russian nationalist authors asserted that the Ukrainian identity and language had both been artificially created in order to "undermine" Russia. Since then, this argument has also been made by other Russian nationalist authors.

Ukrainophobic stereotypes
Within Russian nationalist narratives and propaganda, Ukrainophobic stereotypes range from mockery to ascribing negative traits to the whole Ukrainian nation and people of Ukrainian descent include:
Ukrainians eat lots of salo.
Ukrainians are greedy.
Ukrainians are sly and cunning.
Ukrainians are dishonest.
Ukrainians are antisemites.
Ukrainian language is a broken dialect of Russian.
Ukrainian nationalism is closely associated with neo-Nazism. This is a recurring theme in Russian propaganda within the ongoing Russo-Ukrainian War, usually in the following narratives:
Ukrainians are sympathizers of nationalist leader Stepan Bandera (Banderovtsy), who collaborated with Nazi Germany in World War II. Despite the stereotype, 4.5 million Ukrainians served the Red Army during World War II against Nazi Germany. Ukrainians were also considered Untermenschen by the Nazis for being Slavic and treated accordingly.
Ukrainians are sympathizers of nationalist leader Ivan Mazepa, who wish to betray the Khmelnytskyi's cause.
Ukrainians are followers of nationalist leader Symon Petliura, who artificially wish to secede from the Triune All-Russian Nation.
The whole Ukrainian society is claimed to be dominated by neo-Nazis and ultranationalists who persecuted ethnic Russians and Russian-speaking Ukrainians. This stereotype was used by the Russian government to justify the ongoing 2022 invasion with the aim of "demilitarisation" and "denazification" of Ukraine.

History

In the Russian Empire

The rise and spread of Ukrainian self-awareness around the time of the Revolutions of 1848 produced an anti-Ukrainian sentiment within some layers of society within the Russian Empire. In order to retard and control this movement, the use of Ukrainian language within the Russian empire was initially restricted by official government decrees such as the Valuev Circular (18 July 1863) and later banned by the Ems ukaz (18 May 1876) from any use in print (with the exception of reprinting of old documents). Popularly the anti-Ukrainian sentiment was promulgated by such organizations as the "Black Hundreds", which were vehemently opposed to Ukrainian self-determination. Some restrictions on the use of Ukrainian language were relaxed in 1905–1907. They ceased to be policed after the February Revolution in 1917.

Besides the Ems ukaz and Valuev Circular, there was a series of anti-Ukrainian language edicts starting from the 17th century, when Russia was governed by the House of Romanov. In 1720 Peter the Great issued an edict prohibiting printing books in the Ukrainian language, and since 1729 all edicts and instructions have only been in the Russian language. In 1763 Catherine the Great issued an edict prohibiting lectures in the Ukrainian language at the Kyiv-Mohyla Academy. In 1769 the Most Holy Synod prohibited printing and using the Ukrainian alphabet book. In 1775 the Zaporizhian Sich was destroyed. In 1832 all studying at schools of the Right-bank Ukraine transitioned to exclusively Russian language. In 1847 the Russian government persecuted all members of the Brotherhood of Saints Cyril and Methodius and prohibited the works of Taras Shevchenko, Panteleimon Kulish, Mykola Kostomarov (Nikolai Kostomarov) and others. In 1862 all free Sunday schools for adults in Ukraine were closed. In 1863 the Russian Minister of Interior Valuev decided that the Little Russian language (Ukrainian language) had never existed and could not ever exist. During that time in the winter of 1863–64, the January Uprising took place at the western regions of the Russian Empire, uniting peoples of the former Polish–Lithuanian Commonwealth. Next year in 1864 the "Regulation about elementary school" claimed that all teaching should be conducted in the Russian language. In 1879 the Russian Minister of Education Dmitry Tolstoy (later the Russian Minister of Interior) officially and openly stated that all people of the Russian Empire should be Russified. In the 1880s several edicts were issued prohibiting education in the Ukrainian language at private schools, theatric performances in Ukrainian, any use of Ukrainian in official institutions, and christening Ukrainian names. In 1892 another edict prohibited translation from the Russian to Ukrainian. In 1895 the Main Administration of Publishing prohibited printing children books in Ukrainian. In 1911 the resolution adopted at the 7th Congress of Noblemen in Moscow prohibited the use of any languages other than Russian. In 1914 the Russian government officially prohibited celebrations of the 100th Anniversary of Shevchenko's birthday and posted gendarmes at the Chernecha Hill. The same year Nicholas II of Russia issued an edict prohibiting the Ukrainian press.

Soviet Union

Under Soviet rule in Ukraine, a policy of korenization was adopted after defeat of the Ukrainian People's Republic and initially supported Ukrainian cultural self-awareness. This policy was phased out in 1928 and terminated entirely in 1932 in favor of general Russification.

In 1929 Mykola Kulish wrote a theatrical play "Myna Mazailo" where the author cleverly displays the cultural situation in Ukraine. There was supposedly no anti-Ukrainian sentiment within the Soviet government, which began to repress all aspects of Ukrainian culture and language contrary to the ideology of Proletarian Internationalism.

In 1930 the Union for the Freedom of Ukraine process took place in Kharkiv, after which a number of former Ukrainian politicians and their relatives were deported to Central Asia. The ethnic cleansing against the Ukrainian intelligentsia was never evaluated and is poorly documented.

During the Soviet era, the population of Ukraine was reduced by the artificial famine called Holodomor in 1932–33 along with the population of other nearby agrarian areas of the USSR. According to some scholars, collectivization in the Soviet Union and lack of favored industries were primary contributors to famine mortality (52% of excess deaths), and some evidence shows there was discrimination against ethnic Ukrainians and Germans. According to a Centre for Economic Policy Research paper published in 2021 by Andrei Markevich, Natalya Naumenko, and Nancy Qian, regions with higher Ukrainian population shares were struck harder with centrally planned policies corresponding to famine, and Ukrainian populated areas were given lower amounts of tractors which were correlated to a reduction in famine mortality, ultimately concluding that 92% of famine deaths in Ukraine alone along with 77% of famine deaths in Ukraine, Russia, and Belarus combined can be explained by systematic bias against Ukrainians.

Many prominent Ukrainians were labelled as nationalists or anti-revolutionaries, and many were repressed and executed as enemies of the people.

In January 1944 during a session of Politbureau of the Central Committee of the All-Union Communist Party (Bolsheviks), Stalin personally gave a speech "About anti-Lenin mistakes and nationalistic perversions in a film-tale of Alexander Dovzhenko "Ukraine in flames".

On 2 July 1951, the Communist newspaper Pravda published an article "On Ideological Perversions in Literature" in regards of the Volodymyr Sosyura's poem "Love Ukraine" where it stated the following: "This poem could have been signed by such foes of the Ukrainian people as Petliura and Bandera ... For Sosiura writes about Ukraine and the love of it outside the limits of time and space. This is an ideologically vicious work. Contrary to the truth of life, the poet sings praises of a certain ‘eternal’ Ukraine full of flowers, curly willows, birds, and waves on the Dnipro."

Modern analysis indicates that the Ukrainian language was underrepresented in Soviet media production.

By country

Ukraine
On Sunday 15 July 2012, the national television broadcasting station in Ukraine First National in its news program "Weekly overview" showed a video footage on a development of anti-Ukrainian sentiments within Ukraine.

A propaganda article posted on the website of the Kremenchuk department of the Communist Party of Ukraine argues that history that was published during the Soviet regime was the true history, and that new historical facts being uncovered from the archives are false. The article also denies the existence of the Ukrainian culture.

Mykola Levchenko, a Ukrainian parliamentarian from Party of Regions, and the deputy of Donetsk City Council states that there should be only one language, Russian. He says that the Ukrainian language is impractical and should be avoided. Levchenko called Ukrainian the language of folklore and anecdotes. However, he says he will speak the literary Ukrainian language on principle, once Russian is adopted as the sole state language. Anna German, the spokesperson of the same party, highly criticized those statements.

Mykhailo Bakharev, the vice-speaker of the Crimean Autonomous Republic parliament (and chief editor of Krymskaya Pravda), openly says that there is no Ukrainian language and that it is the language of the non-educated part of population. He claims that it was invented by Taras Shevchenko and others. He also believes that there is no Ukraine nation, there is no future for the Ukrainian State, and that Ukrainization needs to be stopped.

Minister of Education of Ukraine
The former Ukrainian Minister of Science and Education, Dmytro Tabachnyk, sparked protests calling him anti-Ukrainian in some parts of Ukraine due to his statements about Western Ukrainians, his preference for the Russian language, and his denial of the Holodomor. Tabachnyk's view of Ukraine's history includes the thesis that western Ukrainians aren't really Ukrainian. In an article for the Russian newspaper Izvestia Tabachnyk wrote in 2009: “Halychany (western Ukrainians) practically don't have anything in common with the people of Great Ukraine, not in mentality, not in religion, not in linguistics, not in the political arena” “We have different enemies and different allies. Furthermore, our allies and even brothers are their enemies, and their ‘heroes’ (Stepan Bandera, Roman Shukhevych) for us are killers, traitors and abettors of Hitler’s executioners.” By 17 March 2010, four of western Ukraine's regional councils had passed resolutions calling for the minister's dismissal. A host of civic and student organizations from all over the country (including Kherson in southern Ukraine and Donetsk in eastern Ukraine), authors and former Soviet dissidents also signed petitions calling for his removal. Tabachnik also had stated that Ukrainian history textbooks contained "simply false" information and announced his intention to rewrite them.

Russia

In a poll held by Levada Center in June 2009 in Russia 75% of Russian respondents respected Ukrainians as ethnic group but 55% were negative about Ukraine as the state. In May 2009, 96% of Ukrainians polled by Kyiv International Sociology Institute were positive about Russians as ethnic group, 93% respected Russian Federation and 76% respected Russian establishment.

Some Russian media seem to try to discredit Ukraine. Media like Komsomolskaya Pravda seem to try to intensify the bad relationship between Ukraine and Russia. Anti-Ukrainian attitude persists among several Russian politicians, such as the former mayor of Moscow, Yuri Luzhkov, and the former leader of the Liberal Democratic Party of Russia and former Deputy Speaker of the Russian Parliament, Vladimir Zhirinovsky.

In 2006, in letters to Vladimir Putin, Viktor Yushchenko and Vasily Duma, the Ukrainian Cultural Centre of Bashkortostan complained of anti-Ukrainian sentiment in Russia, which they claim includes wide use of anti-Ukrainian ethnic slurs in the mainstream Russian media, television and film. The Urals Association of Ukrainians also made a similar complaint in a letter they addressed to the Organization for Security and Co-operation in Europe in 2000.

According to the Ukrainian Cultural Centre of Bashkortostan, despite their significant presence in Russia, Ukrainians in that country have less access to Ukrainian-language schools and Ukrainian churches than do other ethnic groups. In Vladivostok, according to the head of the Ukrainian government's department of Ukrainian Diaspora Affairs, local Russian officials banned a Ukrainian Sunday school in order not to "accentuate national issues"

According to the president of the Ukrainian World Congress in 2001, persistent requests to register a Ukrainian Orthodox Church – Kyiv Patriarchate or a Ukrainian Catholic Church were hampered due to "particular discrimination" against them, while other Catholic, Muslim and Jewish denominations fared much better. According to the Ukrainian Greek Catholic Church, by 2007 their denomination had only one church building in all of Russia.

In 2008 Nikolai Smirnov released a documentary in which he claims that Ukraine is part of one whole Russia that was split away by different western powers such as Poland, particularly.

In November 2010, the High Court of Russia cancelled registration of one of the biggest civic communities of the Ukrainian minority, the "Federal nation-cultural autonomy of the Ukrainians in Russia" (FNCAUR). According to the author Mykhailo Ratushniy Ukrainian activists continue to face discrimination and bigotry in much of Russia.

The anchorman of a news program "Sunday Time" on the Channel One (Russia) Pyotr Tolstoi announced on 8 July 2012, about the enforced Ukrainization in Ukraine, 20 millions Russians, an invented genocide about Ukrainians, and the distortion of the Russian historiography.

Hungary

Poland 

In late 1995, Ukrainian organization "ZUwP" was demanded to be banned following the  wave of anti-Ukrainian actions that have erupted during the festival of Ukrainian culture in Poland in the border town of Przemyśl in 1995 where numerous threats against participants and numerous acts of vandalism took place. A rise in incidences of graffiti with anti-Ukrainian slogans, and the office of "Związek Ukraińców w Polsce" was set alight. In some cities anti-Ukrainian assaults, vandalism acts of an organised character have targeted centres of Ukrainian culture, schools, churches, memorials.

Ukrainophobic and antisemitic authors (mainly interbellum Endecja activists) published by Polish publishing house Nortom include: Roman Dmowski, Janusz Dobrosz, Jędrzej Giertych, Jan Ludwik Popławski, Maciej Giertych, Stanisław Jastrzębski, Edward Prus, Feliks Koneczny. In 2000, Nortom was forced to withdraw its 12 controversial titles from the Frankfurt Book Fair by the Polish Ministry of Culture representative Andrzej Nowakowski overlooking the Polish exposition. Nortom was accused of selling anti-German, anti-Ukrainian and antisemitic books, especially the following titles: "Być czy nie być" by Stanisław Bełza, "Polska i Niemcy" by Jędrzej Giertych and "I tak nie przemogą. Antykościół, antypolonizm, masoneria" by his son Maciej Giertych. As a result of the above request, the president of the Polish delegation Andrzej Chrzanowski from Polska Izba Książki decided to penalise Nortom by removing it from the 2000 book fair altogether.

Romania

Portugal

Anti-Ukrainian sentiment in Portugal has grown since the arrival of Ukrainian immigrants to Portuguese territory in the 1990s. Most Ukrainians in Portugal work in low-skill and low wages jobs, particularly on cleaning services, construction, manufacturing industries, transport services, hotels and restaurants, due to this, many Ukrainian citizens are constantly victims of aporophobia. Generally in Portugal, citizens of Eastern European countries, no matter what country they are from, are called "Ukrainians" with a hint of contempt for that country, especially when they are poor people. Various members of Portuguese politics have continually called Ukrainians "Nazis" and have gone so far as to say that Lisbon "was infected with Nazis", due to the high presence of Ukrainians in the capital. In March 2020, a Ukrainian citizen named Ihor Humenyuk was interrogated and tortured to death at Lisbon airport while trying to immigrate to Portugal irregularly.

Canada
Anti-Ukrainian discrimination was present in Canada from the arrival of Ukrainians in Canada around 1891 until the late 20th century. In one sense this was part of a larger trend towards nativism in Canada during the period. But Ukrainians were singled out for special discrimination because of their large numbers, visibility (due to dress, non-western European appearance, and language), and political activism. During the First World War, around 8,000 Ukrainian Canadians were interned by the Canadian government as "enemy aliens" (because they came from the Austrian Empire). In the interwar period all Ukrainian cultural and political groups, no matter what their ideology was, were monitored by the Royal Canadian Mounted Police and many of their leaders were deported.

This attitude began to slowly change after the Second World War, as Canadian immigration and cultural policies generally moved from being explicitly nativist to a more pluralistic one. Ukrainian nationalists were now seen as victims of communism, rather than dangerous subversives. Ukrainians began to hold high offices, and one, Senator Paul Yuzyk was one of the earliest proponents of a policy of "multiculturalism" which would end official discrimination and acknowledge the contribution of non-English, non-French Canadians. The Royal Commission on Bilingualism and Biculturalism of the 1960s, which had originally been formed only to deal with French-Canadian grievances, began the transition to multiculturalism in Canada because of Prime Minister Pierre Trudeau's desire to court Ukrainian votes in Western Canada. The commission also included a Ukrainian Canadian commissioner, Jaroslav Rudnyckyj.

Since the adoption of official multiculturalism under Section Twenty-seven of the Canadian Charter of Rights and Freedoms in 1982, Ukrainians in Canada have had legal protection against discrimination. Ukrainian Canadians have held high offices including Governor General (Ray Hnatyshyn), Deputy Prime Minister (Chrystia Freeland), Leader of the Opposition (Rona Ambrose), and several premiers of provinces.

Latvia
According to researcher Mārtiņš Kaprāns of Center for European Policy Analysis, disinformation about Ukraine is dominant in Latvia's pro-Kremlin and Russian language media, which has contributed to a negative image of Ukraine in its Russian-speaking population, while ethnic Latvians are largely supportive of Ukraine. He has named Tatyana Zhdanok,  and vesti.lv as some of the sources of anti-Ukrainian statements in Latvia.

On 20 May 2022, a man in Riga was ordered to pay 6034.55 euros as material and moral damages and sentenced to 200 hours of community service for attacking a young man with a flag of Ukraine on his shoulders. A police officer and an alleged spouse of the attacker present at the moment of the attack was fired from the State Police for negligence. On 24 June 2022, a criminal case was launched against two young people for burning a flag of Ukraine at Vērmane Garden with the intention of posting the video on TikTok to gain popularity and provoke Ukrainians.

Slang references to Ukrainians and Ukrainian culture

The use of ethnic slurs and stereotypes in relation to Ukrainians in Russian media is one of Ukrainian community's concerns in Russia.

Ethnic slurs
 khokhol – derived from a term for a traditional Cossack-style haircut.
 saloied – Literally "salo eater"; based on a stereotype and a running joke that salo is a national food favorite of the Ukrainians.
 Ukr, plural Ukry – After gaining independence, Ukrainians started rebuilding their history after a long period of Polonization and Russification. This nation-building drive was derided by Russians. A Russian running joke is that Ukrainians derive the name of the country Ukraine from the name of the supposed ancient tribe of "Ukrs". Also derisively called Great Ukrs, Velikiie Ukry.
 Ukrop – Literally "dill", a pun: Ukrainian = ukrop. The slur was reappropriated by Ukrainians during the war in Donbass and later adopted by the UKROP party.
 Szoszon – In Poland, especially eastern parts of the country, imitative of Ukrainian sho, literally "what?", and a pun on the Shoshone tribe of North America.

Political insults and historical nicknames
 Maloross – Ukrainian, "Little Russian", "dweller of Malorossiya". Revival of a nineteenth-century imperial Russian term dismissive of independent Ukrainian nationality. Ukrainians often use this to describe culturally russified Ukrainians.
There are a number of Russian insults based on the alleged opposition of all Ukrainians to all things Russian (or all things Soviet, in the past): 
 Mazepinets – Mazepite, Ivan Mazepa supporter, archaic.
 Pietliurovets – Petlyurite, Symon Petliura supporter.
 Banderivets, or Banderovets, also variants Bandera, Banderlog, Benderovets. – "Banderite", a term used to associate Ukrainian national identity with radical nationalism. Historically, referred to supporters of far-right nationalist politician Stepan Bandera (1909–59). 
 Zhydobandera, Zhidobandera, or Zhydobanderovets – "Yid-Banderite" or "Judeo-Banderite" a conflation of Zhyd (i.e., a Kike) and a Bandera follower. This is an ironic self-appellation coined by Ukrainian Jewish activists during the Euromaidan protests to highlight the inconsistency of Russian propaganda which demonized Ukrainian pro-Europe and pro-democracy activism as fascist to the West and as Jewish to Ukrainians, with reference to "Judeo-Bolshevism".
 Maidaun – a conflation of the Maidan protest movement and daun, person with Down Syndrome.
 Maidanutyi – a conflation of the Maidan and the yebanutyi, "fucked in the head" (insane). 
 kastruliegolovyi – literally "cooking pot-headed". A derogatory term for Euromaidan supporters. So-called "Dictatorship laws" banned, among other things, the use of helmets during mass gatherings. On 19 January 2014 some Euromaidan participants mocked the ban by wearing cookware as helmets.
 svidomit – a conflation of Ukrainian svidomyi, "conscious, conscientious", and Russian sodomit, "sodomite".
Banderlog – a conflation of Bandera and Bandar-log.
Pigs – refers to a stereotype that Ukrainians love to eat salo and pork in general.

Other
 mova – a Russian derisive slang reference to Ukrainian language ("language" is mova in Ukrainian, yazyk in Russian).
 nezalezhnaya – a Russian derisive slang reference to Ukraine. Borrowing of Ukrainian nezalezhna, "independent", with a Russian ending, mocking the historical Ukrainian struggle for independence (compare Russian nezavisimaya). Sometimes used colloquially by Russians and Russian mass media to express ironic, disparaging attitude towards Ukraine.
 ukrainstvyushiy – literally - "one that plays Ukrainian". Refers to Ukrainian national project - a political theory that theory that assumes the Ukrainian nation was created artificially, for political reasons to get rid of Russian culture, out of spitefulness.

Anti-Ukrainian sentiment in culture and media 
 72 meters

See also
 Chronology of Ukrainian language bans
 Russification of Ukraine
 Slavophobia
 Dziuba, Ivan, Internationalism or Russification?, a dissident's Marxist critique of  the national and cultural policy of the Soviet Union in Ukraine
 "What Russia should do with Ukraine"
 Russian allegations of fascism against Ukraine

References and footnotes

External links

 Article that lists the communist regime crimes against Ukrainians
 S. Velychenko, "The Strange Case of Foreign Pro Russian Radical Leftists"

 
Ukrainian
Human rights in Ukraine
Russification
Racism
Racism in Ukraine